Brīvā Latvija. Latvju Raksti (Free Latvia. Latvian Writings) was the name of an underground, anti-German resistance newspaper in Nazi-occupied Latvia during World War II. Its first four issues appeared under the title Vēstījums (Message). The newspaper's editor and principal author was the Latvian fascist Gustavs Celmiņš. When the newspaper and its distribution networks were uncovered were discovered by the Gestapo, Celmiņš and others were arrested and sent to prison or concentration camps.

References

External links 
 Information on Brīvā Latvija (1943–44) from historia.lv

Defunct newspapers published in Latvia
Underground press in World War II
Generalbezirk Lettland
Newspapers established in 1943
Publications disestablished in 1944
1943 establishments in Latvia
1944 disestablishments in Latvia